The 2016 Challenger Banque Nationale de Granby was a professional tennis tournament played on outdoor hard courts. It was the 23rd edition, for men, and 6th edition, for women, of the tournament and part of the 2016 ATP Challenger Tour and the 2016 ITF Women's Circuit, offering totals of $100,000, for men, and $50,000, for women, in prize money. It took take place in Granby, Quebec, Canada between August 1 and August 7, 2016.

Men's singles main-draw entrants

Seeds

1 Rankings are as of July 25, 2016

Other entrants
The following players received wildcards into the singles main draw:
 Félix Auger-Aliassime
 Philip Bester
 Brayden Schnur
 Denis Shapovalov

The following players received entry from the qualifying draw:
 Edward Corrie
 Emilio Gómez
 James McGee
 Yasutaka Uchiyama

Women's singles main-draw entrants

Seeds

1 Rankings are as of July 25, 2016

Other entrants
The following players received wildcards into the singles main draw:
 Bianca Andreescu
 Marie-Alexandre Leduc
 Charlotte Robillard-Millette
 Erin Routliffe

The following players received entry from the qualifying draw:
 Catherine Leduc
 Nicole Melichar
 Alexandra Stevenson
 Jessica Wacnik

The following players entered the singles main draw with a protected ranking:
 Miharu Imanishi
 Samantha Murray

Champions

Men's singles

 Frances Tiafoe def.  Marcelo Arévalo, 6–1, 6–1

Women's singles

 Jennifer Brady def.  Olga Govortsova, 7–5, 6–2

Men's doubles

 Guilherme Clezar /  Alejandro González def.  Saketh Myneni /  Sanam Singh, 3–6, 6–1, [12–10]

Women's doubles

 Jamie Loeb /  An-Sophie Mestach def.  Julia Glushko /  Olga Govortsova, 6–4, 6–4

External links
Official website

Challenger Banque Nationale de Granby
Challenger Banque Nationale de Granby
Challenger de Granby
Challenger Banque Nationale de Granby